Faron Young Sings the Best of Faron Young (also known as Sings the Best) is a compilation album by country music singer Faron Young.

Track listing

References

1960 compilation albums
Capitol Records compilation albums
Country music compilation albums
Faron Young albums